Jacob Thomas Schell (December 27, 1850 – July 29, 1916) was a merchant and political figure. He represented Glengarry in the House of Commons of Canada from 1900 to 1908 as a Liberal member.

He was born in East Oxford Township, Canada West in 1850, the son of Jacob Schell, and educated in Woodstock. He is greatgrandson of Johann Christian Schell, a Palatine German from German Flatts, New York, who died fighting for the Americans in 1782 on his farm. The family moved to Canada after the American Revolution to take advantage of the land available in Ontario. In 1882, he moved to Alexandria and became a partner with David Murdoch Macpherson in a cheese box factory there. The company also manufactured other wooden items. Schell was also involved in railway construction. He ran unsuccessfully for the same seat in the House of Commons in 1891. Schell served on the town council of Alexandria. After his death in 1916, he was buried in Woodstock.

His brother Malcolm Smith Schell also served in the Canadian House of Commons, and at the same time.

External links 
 
 Stormont, Dundas and Glengarry : a history, 1784-1945, JG Harkness (1946)

1850 births
1916 deaths
Liberal Party of Canada MPs
Members of the House of Commons of Canada from Ontario
Canadian Methodists